"All I Wanna Do" is a song by Danish DJ and producer Martin Jensen, featuring uncredited vocals by Bjørnskov. It was released on 8 April 2016 as digital download by Disco:wax. The song was written by Martin Jensen, Lene Dissing and Peter Bjørnskov.

Music video
A music video to accompany the release of "All I Wanna Do" was first released onto YouTube on 10 June 2016 at a total length of three minutes and fourteen seconds, with an cameo appearance by Rachel Weisz.

Track listing

Charts

Weekly charts

Year-end charts

Certifications

Release history

References

2016 songs
2016 singles
Songs written by Peter Bjørnskov
Martin Jensen songs